The Hsiahsing Power Plant is a fuel-fired power plant in Jinhu Township, Kinmen County, Taiwan.

History
The first two units of the power plant were commissioned on 20 July 1982. On 17 November 1989, the 3rd unit of the plant went into operation and on 3 May 1993, the fourth, fifth and sixth units went into operation. After the Tashan Power Plant in Jincheng Township went into operation in October 2000, Hsiahsing Power Plant was used for military purpose. In May 2020, an energy storage system was built for the plant, which consists of 1MWh lithium-ion battery, 2 MW power conditioner, energy management system and environment management system.

Technical specifications
The primary fuel for the power plant is diesel. It has a total combined installed generation capacity of 20.31 MW.

See also
 List of power stations in Taiwan
 Electricity sector in Taiwan

References

1982 establishments in Taiwan
Buildings and structures in Kinmen County
Energy infrastructure completed in 1982
Jinhu Township
Oil-fired power stations in Taiwan